Harald Pettersen (8 December 1911 – 18 March 1978) was a Norwegian footballer. He played in three matches for the Norway national football team from 1930 to 1931.

References

External links
 

1911 births
1978 deaths
Norwegian footballers
Norway international footballers
Place of birth missing
Association footballers not categorized by position